La Soukra is a city and commune in the Ariana Governorate of Tunisia. As of 2004 it had a total population of 129,693.

It is located in the center of a vast agricultural plain occupied by orange orchards of which only a few traces remain. Indeed, during the years 2000 and 2010, urban expansion changed the appearance of the city.

Education
British International School of Tunis is in La Soukra.

See also
List of cities in Tunisia

References

Communes of Tunisia
Populated places in Ariana Governorate
Tunisia geography articles needing translation from French Wikipedia